Iraqi Republic Railways Company (IRR) is the national railway operator in Iraq.

Network
IRR has one international interchange, with Chemins de Fer Syriens (CFS) at Rabiya. The system runs from Rabiya southward through Mosul, Baiji, and Baghdad to Basra, with a branch line from Shouaiba Junction (near Basra) to the ports of Khor Az Zubair and Umm Qasr, westward from Baghdad through Ramadi and Haqlaniya to Al Qaim and Husayba, with a branch line from Al Qaim to Akashat, and east-west from Haqlaniya through Bayji to Kirkuk.

History

The first section of railway in what was then the Ottoman Empire province of Mesopotamia was a  length of the Baghdad Railway between that city & Samarra opened in 1914. Work had started northwards from Baghdad with the aim of meeting the section being constructed across Turkey and Syria to Tel Kotchek and an extension northwards from Samarra to Baiji was opened in December 1918.

From 1916 onwards an invading British Military force brought narrow gauge equipment, firstly  gauge and later  gauge from India to Southern Mesopotamia to construct various sections of line to support its offensive against the Turks. Britain defeated the Ottomans and Mesopotamia became a League of Nations mandate under British administration. In April 1920 the British military authorities transferred all railways to a British civilian administration, Mesopotamian Railways.

The metre gauge line from Basra to Nasiriyah was the most important section constructed during the war in terms of its significance as part of later efforts to construct a national railway network. Soon after the end of World War I this was extended northwards from Ur Junction outside Nasiriyah up the Euphrates valley with the complete Basra to Baghdad route being opened on 16 January 1920.

The other section of metre gauge line built during World War I that had ongoing significance was that from Baghdad East north eastwards to the Persian border. After the war the eastern end of this line was diverted to Khanaqin and the wartime built line north west from Jalula Junction was extended from Kingerban to Kirkuk in 1925.

In 1932 Iraq became independent from the UK. In March 1936 the UK sold Mesopotamian Railways to Iraq, which renamed the company Iraqi State Railways. Work resumed on the extension of the Baghdad Railway between Tel Kotchek on the Syrian frontier and Baiji. The through route was opened and completed on 15 July 1940. In 1941 the Iraqi State Railways PC class 4-6-2 steam locomotives were introduced to haul the Baghdad — Istanbul Taurus Express on the Baghdad Railway between Baghdad and Tel Kotchek. From 1941 onwards the UK War Department supplemented ISR's locomotive fleets: the metre gauge with HG class 4-6-0s requisitioned from India and new USATC S118 Class 2-8-2's from the US, and the standard gauge with new LMS Stanier Class 8F 2-8-0s and USATC S100 Class 0-6-0T's.

In 1947 the Iraq Petroleum Company opened a branch at Kirkuk, which it operated with its own Hudswell Clarke 2-8-4T's from 1951. ISR opened a new metre gauge line from Kirkuk to Arbil in 1949. A joint road and rail bridge was opened across the River Tigris in Baghdad in 1950, finally connecting the east and west bank metre gauge systems. ISR added new steam locomotives in the 1950s: 20 metre gauge 2-8-2's from Ferrostaal of Essen and 10 from Vulcan Foundry in 1953 and 20 more from Maschinenfabrik Esslingen in 1955-56 and 2-8-0s from Krupp, plus standard gauge 2-8-0s also from Krupp.

In 1958 when Iraq's Hashemite monarchy was overthrown and a republic declared, ISR was renamed Iraqi Republic Railways. In 1961 IRR began to replace its standard gauge steam locomotive fleet with diesels from ČKD and Alco. In 1972 several classes of steam locomotive were still in service on the standard gauge system, but these were replaced by further classes of diesel from Alstom, Montreal Locomotive Works and MACOSA. IRR did not begin to replace its metre gauge steam locomotives until after 1983.

In 1964 IRR extended its standard gauge network with a line from Baghdad to Basrah which opened for freight in 1964 and for passengers in 1968. It has since been extended from Shouaiba Junction to the port of Umm Qasr.

From 1980 until 2003 IRR suffered approximately one billion United States dollars' worth of war and looting damage.

Passenger services
In around October 2008, a commuter service resumed between Baghdad Central and the southern suburb of Doura. There is a nightly service between Baghdad and Basra and a Friday-only pilgrims service to Samarra. In March 2009, a weekly service started between Baghdad and Fallujah. The Baghdad - Mosul line is almost ready for passenger services to resume.
CSR Sifang Co Ltd. is supplying 10 new  trains in 2014.

Rolling stock

Current (information partly from 2004)

Retired

Developments

Iraq-Syria Direct Railway Link

Syrian Railways had been extending a rail route from Deir ez-Zor Junction towards the modern Husaibah branch terminus on the Iraqi side of the border, which was built as a through station. The route follows the Euphrates river valley and Google Earth shows the route complete to the border, including a new customs exchange yard, but requiring  of formation on the Iraqi side. The civil war in Syria and insurgency in Iraq have prevented further progress in the last decade. This route would be more direct than the existing one via the border station at Tall Kushik.

Iraq-Jordan Direct Railway Link
In August 2011, the Jordanian government approved the construction of the railway from Aqaba to the Iraqi border (near Traibil). The Iraqis in the meantime started the construction of the line from the border to their current railhead at Ramadi.

High-speed Baghdad-Basra line

In 2011, a   line between Baghdad and Basra was planned, with the Iraqi Railways and Alstom designing the route.

It started operations since 2014, and at that time not classified as a true high-speed rail. New trainsets for use on the Baghdad-Basra route were unveiled in China in February 2014 before being shipped to Iraq.

Iraq-Iran Basra-Shalamcheh line 
In December 2021, Iran and Iraq agreed today to build a railway connecting both countries.The project would connect Basra in southern Iraq to Shalamcheh in western Iran. There are only around 30 kilometers (18 miles) between the two areas. The railway would be strategically important for Iran, linking the country to the Mediterranean Sea via Iraq and Syria’s railways.

Couplings
IRR uses Soviet-style SA3 couplers. In order to allow interchange with CFS and Turkish State Railways which both use screw couplers, IRR locomotives and most wagons are equipped with screw couplers and buffers. In Iraqi service the buffers do not make contact and the screw couplings hang down unattached. The railways in adjoining Saudi Arabia use American type Janney automatic couplers. There is currently no rail link planned to Saudi Arabia.

Rail links to adjacent countries
 Iran - one link partially under construction and a second link planned
 Khorramshahr, Iran, to Basra, Iraq - almost complete (2006)
 Kermanshah, Iran, and the Iraqi province of Diyala - construction commenced.
 Jordan - partially constructed - break of gauge / gauge
 Syria - same gauge - at Rabiaa/al-Ya'rubiya

See also
 Arab Mashreq International Railway
 List of railway stations in Iraq
 Transport in Iraq

References

Sources

External links

 , general information
 , map of railway routes in Iraq
 
 
 
 
 Iraq Railways Photos on YouTube
 Basic technical specifications of Iraqi standard and metre gauge steam locomotives
 Map of Iraq railways in 2009 drawn by Joseph Redford
 Taurus Express—information on passenger trains in Turkey and Iraq from Werner and Hans Soelch's Trains-WorldExpresses site
 Taurus Express 1972—photos from a trip through Turkey and Iraq in 1972
  Louis Culshaw's photos of MG steam in 1982

Rail transport in Iraq
Railway companies of Iraq
Government-owned companies of Iraq
Iraqi brands
Standard gauge railways in Iraq
Metre gauge railways in Iraq
2 ft 6 in gauge railways in Iraq
Railway companies established in 1905
1905 establishments in the Ottoman Empire